Olena Fetisova is the European Documentary Network and Ukrainian Filmmakers Union Member, 2009 Ukrainian State Film Award Winner, 2009 EAVE Graduate. Olena was born in Kyiv, Ukraine to a family of filmmakers, 1964. Still lives in Kyiv.

Career 

She graduated from the Moscow Film School VGIK, 1987. She has been working in the film industry without interruption ever since. In 2001 she founded the Interfilm Production Studio. Fetisova refused the State Award of Armenia in 2014 in protest of Armenian recognition of the “referendum” in Crimea.

Filmography

References

1964 births
Living people
Film people from Kyiv
Ukrainian film producers
Ukrainian women film producers